The 1963 VFL season was the 67th season of the Victorian Football League (VFL), the highest level senior Australian rules football competition in Victoria. The season featured twelve clubs, ran from 20 April until 5 October, and comprised an 18-game home-and-away season followed by a finals series featuring the top four clubs.

The premiership was won by the Geelong Football Club for the sixth time, after it defeated  by 49 points in the 1963 VFL Grand Final.

Premiership season
In 1963, the VFL competition consisted of twelve teams of 18 on-the-field players each, plus two substitute players, known as the 19th man and the 20th man. A player could be substituted for any reason; however, once substituted, a player could not return to the field of play under any circumstances.

Teams played each other in a home-and-away season of 18 rounds; matches 12 to 18 were the "home-and-way reverse" of matches 1 to 7.

Once the 18 round home-and-away season had finished, the 1963 VFL Premiers were determined by the specific format and conventions of the Page–McIntyre system.

Alterations to 1963 match fixtures
Persistent rain throughout the week and further heavy downpours on the Friday (12 July) caused the postponement of all Round 11 matches until the following Saturday (20 July). All remaining home-and-away and finals matches were played a week later than had been scheduled.

Round 1

|- style="background:#ccf;"
| Home team
| Home team score
| Away team
| Away team score
| Venue
| Crowd
| Date
|- style="background:#fff;"
| 
| 16.26 (122)
| 
| 9.9 (63)
| Kardinia Park
| 33,953
| 20 April 1963
|- style="background:#fff;"
| 
| 13.5 (83)
| 
| 9.11 (65)
| Junction Oval
| 31,300
| 20 April 1963
|- style="background:#fff;"
| 
| 11.11 (77)
| 
| 5.10 (40)
| Arden Street Oval
| 21,960
| 20 April 1963
|- style="background:#fff;"
| 
| 8.12 (60)
| 
| 13.7 (85)
| Glenferrie Oval
| 30,000
| 20 April 1963
|- style="background:#fff;"
| 
| 11.14 (80)
| 
| 18.16 (124)
| Punt Road Oval
| 32,200
| 20 April 1963
|- style="background:#fff;"
| 
| 10.12 (72)
| 
| 14.11 (95)
| Brunswick Street Oval
| 25,167
| 20 April 1963

Round 2

|- style="background:#ccf;"
| Home team
| Home team score
| Away team
| Away team score
| Venue
| Crowd
| Date
|- style="background:#fff;"
| 
| 12.14 (86)
| 
| 17.7 (109)
| Lake Oval
| 25,700
| 25 April 1963
|- style="background:#fff;"
| 
| 14.16 (100)
| 
| 13.18 (96)
| MCG
| 55,293
| 25 April 1963
|- style="background:#fff;"
| 
| 16.13 (109)
| 
| 6.14 (50)
| Windy Hill
| 40,000
| 27 April 1963
|- style="background:#fff;"
| 
| 8.14 (62)
| 
| 12.9 (81)
| Victoria Park
| 32,210
| 27 April 1963
|- style="background:#fff;"
| 
| 7.11 (53)
| 
| 6.15 (51)
| Princes Park
| 39,490
| 27 April 1963
|- style="background:#fff;"
| 
| 15.11 (101)
| 
| 7.13 (55)
| Western Oval
| 21,791
| 27 April 1963

Round 3

|- style="background:#ccf;"
| Home team
| Home team score
| Away team
| Away team score
| Venue
| Crowd
| Date
|- style="background:#fff;"
| 
| 9.13 (67)
| 
| 11.11 (77)
| Brunswick Street Oval
| 18,544
| 4 May 1963
|- style="background:#fff;"
| 
| 9.14 (68)
| 
| 9.9 (63)
| Windy Hill
| 27,283
| 4 May 1963
|- style="background:#fff;"
| 
| 8.16 (64)
| 
| 13.22 (100)
| Victoria Park
| 27,419
| 4 May 1963
|- style="background:#fff;"
| 
| 6.12 (48)
| 
| 10.9 (69)
| Punt Road Oval
| 23,200
| 4 May 1963
|- style="background:#fff;"
| 
| 10.25 (85)
| 
| 10.4 (64)
| Kardinia Park
| 26,523
| 4 May 1963
|- style="background:#fff;"
| 
| 10.14 (74)
| 
| 16.15 (111)
| Lake Oval
| 22,850
| 4 May 1963

Round 4

|- style="background:#ccf;"
| Home team
| Home team score
| Away team
| Away team score
| Venue
| Crowd
| Date
|- style="background:#fff;"
| 
| 21.25 (151)
| 
| 11.14 (80)
| Glenferrie Oval
| 15,000
| 11 May 1963
|- style="background:#fff;"
| 
| 14.12 (96)
| 
| 11.11 (77)
| Western Oval
| 21,695
| 11 May 1963
|- style="background:#fff;"
| 
| 9.13 (67)
| 
| 8.13 (61)
| Princes Park
| 42,919
| 11 May 1963
|- style="background:#fff;"
| 
| 3.7 (25)
| 
| 7.19 (61)
| Arden Street Oval
| 21,700
| 11 May 1963
|- style="background:#fff;"
| 
| 14.10 (94)
| 
| 8.7 (55)
| MCG
| 25,462
| 11 May 1963
|- style="background:#fff;"
| 
| 14.13 (97)
| 
| 11.7 (73)
| Junction Oval
| 37,700
| 11 May 1963

Round 5

|- style="background:#ccf;"
| Home team
| Home team score
| Away team
| Away team score
| Venue
| Crowd
| Date
|- style="background:#fff;"
| 
| 10.12 (72)
| 
| 3.11 (29)
| Kardinia Park
| 33,084
| 18 May 1963
|- style="background:#fff;"
| 
| 8.9 (57)
| 
| 11.10 (76)
| Western Oval
| 22,251
| 18 May 1963
|- style="background:#fff;"
| 
| 15.10 (100)
| 
| 7.10 (52)
| Victoria Park
| 30,121
| 18 May 1963
|- style="background:#fff;"
| 
| 17.11 (113)
| 
| 11.9 (75)
| Lake Oval
| 14,900
| 18 May 1963
|- style="background:#fff;"
| 
| 6.15 (51)
| 
| 16.16 (112)
| Brunswick Street Oval
| 15,504
| 18 May 1963
|- style="background:#fff;"
| 
| 11.9 (75)
| 
| 11.11 (77)
| Punt Road Oval
| 25,400
| 18 May 1963

Round 6

|- style="background:#ccf;"
| Home team
| Home team score
| Away team
| Away team score
| Venue
| Crowd
| Date
|- style="background:#fff;"
| 
| 13.16 (94)
| 
| 8.5 (53)
| Junction Oval
| 26,400
| 25 May 1963
|- style="background:#fff;"
| 
| 20.15 (135)
| 
| 7.14 (56)
| MCG
| 33,914
| 25 May 1963
|- style="background:#fff;"
| 
| 11.17 (83)
| 
| 9.7 (61)
| Glenferrie Oval
| 14,387
| 25 May 1963
|- style="background:#fff;"
| 
| 13.16 (94)
| 
| 6.18 (54)
| Windy Hill
| 27,455
| 25 May 1963
|- style="background:#fff;"
| 
| 7.16 (58)
| 
| 7.22 (64)
| Princes Park
| 47,514
| 25 May 1963
|- style="background:#fff;"
| 
| 9.5 (59)
| 
| 12.14 (86)
| Brunswick Street Oval
| 23,930
| 25 May 1963

Round 7

|- style="background:#ccf;"
| Home team
| Home team score
| Away team
| Away team score
| Venue
| Crowd
| Date
|- style="background:#fff;"
| 
| 8.10 (58)
| 
| 9.12 (66)
| Arden Street Oval
| 17,125
| 1 June 1963
|- style="background:#fff;"
| 
| 9.12 (66)
| 
| 9.12 (66)
| Kardinia Park
| 29,374
| 1 June 1963
|- style="background:#fff;"
| 
| 10.11 (71)
| 
| 13.9 (87)
| Victoria Park
| 44,501
| 1 June 1963
|- style="background:#fff;"
| 
| 11.8 (74)
| 
| 8.22 (70)
| Lake Oval
| 17,160
| 1 June 1963
|- style="background:#fff;"
| 
| 17.13 (115)
| 
| 13.8 (86)
| Punt Road Oval
| 16,500
| 1 June 1963
|- style="background:#fff;"
| 
| 7.7 (49)
| 
| 8.9 (57)
| Western Oval
| 26,107
| 1 June 1963

Round 8

|- style="background:#ccf;"
| Home team
| Home team score
| Away team
| Away team score
| Venue
| Crowd
| Date
|- style="background:#fff;"
| 
| 13.11 (89)
| 
| 7.5 (47)
| Windy Hill
| 21,200
| 8 June 1963
|- style="background:#fff;"
| 
| 6.8 (44)
| 
| 6.10 (46)
| Princes Park
| 38,698
| 8 June 1963
|- style="background:#fff;"
| 
| 8.13 (61)
| 
| 9.11 (65)
| Junction Oval
| 34,900
| 8 June 1963
|- style="background:#fff;"
| 
| 6.16 (52)
| 
| 5.9 (39)
| Western Oval
| 22,950
| 10 June 1963
|- style="background:#fff;"
| 
| 2.11 (23)
| 
| 6.15 (51)
| Brunswick Street Oval
| 13,400
| 10 June 1963
|- style="background:#fff;"
| 
| 11.16 (82)
| 
| 4.11 (35)
| MCG
| 81,550
| 10 June 1963

Round 9

|- style="background:#ccf;"
| Home team
| Home team score
| Away team
| Away team score
| Venue
| Crowd
| Date
|- style="background:#fff;"
| 
| 18.6 (114)
| 
| 9.10 (64)
| MCG
| 23,971
| 22 June 1963
|- style="background:#fff;"
| 
| 16.13 (109)
| 
| 10.11 (71)
| Kardinia Park
| 20,681
| 22 June 1963
|- style="background:#fff;"
| 
| 4.16 (40)
| 
| 8.8 (56)
| Windy Hill
| 24,725
| 22 June 1963
|- style="background:#fff;"
| 
| 11.6 (72)
| 
| 6.4 (40)
| Victoria Park
| 26,173
| 22 June 1963
|- style="background:#fff;"
| 
| 8.10 (58)
| 
| 5.9 (39)
| Lake Oval
| 12,850
| 22 June 1963
|- style="background:#fff;"
| 
| 9.6 (60)
| 
| 7.12 (54)
| Glenferrie Oval
| 25,300
| 22 June 1963

Round 10

|- style="background:#ccf;"
| Home team
| Home team score
| Away team
| Away team score
| Venue
| Crowd
| Date
|- style="background:#fff;"
| 
| 19.11 (125)
| 
| 11.8 (74)
| Victoria Park
| 24,820
| 29 June 1963
|- style="background:#fff;"
| 
| 8.8 (56)
| 
| 12.12 (84)
| Princes Park
| 32,600
| 29 June 1963
|- style="background:#fff;"
| 
| 14.13 (97)
| 
| 15.11 (101)
| Junction Oval
| 27,700
| 29 June 1963
|- style="background:#fff;"
| 
| 9.13 (67)
| 
| 3.13 (31)
| Brunswick Street Oval
| 16,221
| 6 July 1963
|- style="background:#fff;"
| 
| 4.10 (34)
| 
| 11.14 (80)
| Punt Road Oval
| 20,300
| 6 July 1963
|- style="background:#fff;"
| 
| 5.5 (35)
| 
| 9.9 (63)
| Arden Street Oval
| 17,560
| 6 July 1963

Round 11

|- style="background:#ccf;"
| Home team
| Home team score
| Away team
| Away team score
| Venue
| Crowd
| Date
|- style="background:#fff;"
| 
| 9.4 (58)
| 
| 14.16 (100)
| Punt Road Oval
| 15,000
| 20 July 1963
|- style="background:#fff;"
| 
| 3.6 (24)
| 
| 10.9 (69)
| Western Oval
| 18,231
| 20 July 1963
|- style="background:#fff;"
| 
| 9.17 (71)
| 
| 6.2 (38)
| Glenferrie Oval
| 10,500
| 20 July 1963
|- style="background:#fff;"
| 
| 6.10 (46)
| 
| 12.20 (92)
| Lake Oval
| 16,000
| 20 July 1963
|- style="background:#fff;"
| 
| 7.13 (55)
| 
| 5.13 (43)
| Kardinia Park
| 31,578
| 20 July 1963
|- style="background:#fff;"
| 
| 8.14 (62)
| 
| 5.9 (39)
| Arden Street Oval
| 13,870
| 20 July 1963

Round 12

|- style="background:#ccf;"
| Home team
| Home team score
| Away team
| Away team score
| Venue
| Crowd
| Date
|- style="background:#fff;"
| 
| 14.14 (98)
| 
| 5.9 (39)
| MCG
| 55,060
| 27 July 1963
|- style="background:#fff;"
| 
| 10.11 (71)
| 
| 7.10 (52)
| Western Oval
| 15,715
| 27 July 1963
|- style="background:#fff;"
| 
| 11.17 (83)
| 
| 7.10 (52)
| Windy Hill
| 25,500
| 27 July 1963
|- style="background:#fff;"
| 
| 12.12 (84)
| 
| 13.7 (85)
| Victoria Park
| 23,286
| 27 July 1963
|- style="background:#fff;"
| 
| 16.19 (115)
| 
| 11.8 (74)
| Princes Park
| 16,909
| 27 July 1963
|- style="background:#fff;"
| 
| 8.12 (60)
| 
| 14.11 (95)
| Lake Oval
| 14,500
| 27 July 1963

Round 13

|- style="background:#ccf;"
| Home team
| Home team score
| Away team
| Away team score
| Venue
| Crowd
| Date
|- style="background:#fff;"
| 
| 9.10 (64)
| 
| 20.10 (130)
| Punt Road Oval
| 15,000
| 3 August 1963
|- style="background:#fff;"
| 
| 13.6 (84)
| 
| 8.14 (62)
| Glenferrie Oval
| 34,000
| 3 August 1963
|- style="background:#fff;"
| 
| 7.7 (49)
| 
| 10.20 (80)
| Brunswick Street Oval
| 13,892
| 3 August 1963
|- style="background:#fff;"
| 
| 14.15 (99)
| 
| 9.8 (62)
| Kardinia Park
| 40,885
| 3 August 1963
|- style="background:#fff;"
| 
| 9.17 (71)
| 
| 8.10 (58)
| Arden Street Oval
| 16,083
| 3 August 1963
|- style="background:#fff;"
| 
| 14.12 (96)
| 
| 7.13 (55)
| Junction Oval
| 30,100
| 3 August 1963

Round 14

|- style="background:#ccf;"
| Home team
| Home team score
| Away team
| Away team score
| Venue
| Crowd
| Date
|- style="background:#fff;"
| 
| 11.8 (74)
| 
| 10.4 (64)
| Arden Street Oval
| 9,807
| 10 August 1963
|- style="background:#fff;"
| 
| 5.8 (38)
| 
| 8.10 (58)
| Western Oval
| 25,645
| 10 August 1963
|- style="background:#fff;"
| 
| 17.13 (115)
| 
| 8.9 (57)
| Princes Park
| 17,510
| 10 August 1963
|- style="background:#fff;"
| 
| 16.21 (117)
| 
| 2.3 (15)
| Junction Oval
| 15,700
| 10 August 1963
|- style="background:#fff;"
| 
| 19.8 (122)
| 
| 10.11 (71)
| MCG
| 71,086
| 10 August 1963
|- style="background:#fff;"
| 
| 15.9 (99)
| 
| 8.9 (57)
| Glenferrie Oval
| 19,458
| 10 August 1963

Round 15

|- style="background:#ccf;"
| Home team
| Home team score
| Away team
| Away team score
| Venue
| Crowd
| Date
|- style="background:#fff;"
| 
| 15.8 (98)
| 
| 5.13 (43)
| Kardinia Park
| 21,396
| 17 August 1963
|- style="background:#fff;"
| 
| 8.9 (57)
| 
| 22.21 (153)
| Brunswick Street Oval
| 11,989
| 17 August 1963
|- style="background:#fff;"
| 
| 6.6 (42)
| 
| 14.20 (104)
| Victoria Park
| 27,298
| 17 August 1963
|- style="background:#fff;"
| 
| 6.9 (45)
| 
| 15.15 (105)
| Lake Oval
| 14,100
| 17 August 1963
|- style="background:#fff;"
| 
| 7.10 (52)
| 
| 16.21 (117)
| Punt Road Oval
| 15,200
| 17 August 1963
|- style="background:#fff;"
| 
| 10.10 (70)
| 
| 11.10 (76)
| Windy Hill
| 29,000
| 17 August 1963

Round 16

|- style="background:#ccf;"
| Home team
| Home team score
| Away team
| Away team score
| Venue
| Crowd
| Date
|- style="background:#fff;"
| 
| 12.12 (84)
| 
| 5.9 (39)
| Arden Street Oval
| 9,506
| 24 August 1963
|- style="background:#fff;"
| 
| 16.21 (117)
| 
| 5.6 (36)
| Windy Hill
| 14,175
| 24 August 1963
|- style="background:#fff;"
| 
| 10.18 (78)
| 
| 12.13 (85)
| Princes Park
| 15,170
| 24 August 1963
|- style="background:#fff;"
| 
| 12.18 (90)
| 
| 8.21 (69)
| Junction Oval
| 44,900
| 24 August 1963
|- style="background:#fff;"
| 
| 13.21 (99)
| 
| 8.7 (55)
| Glenferrie Oval
| 17,000
| 24 August 1963
|- style="background:#fff;"
| 
| 19.15 (129)
| 
| 10.8 (68)
| MCG
| 43,057
| 24 August 1963

Round 17

|- style="background:#ccf;"
| Home team
| Home team score
| Away team
| Away team score
| Venue
| Crowd
| Date
|- style="background:#fff;"
| 
| 20.14 (134)
| 
| 12.15 (87)
| Victoria Park
| 16,892
| 31 August 1963
|- style="background:#fff;"
| 
| 8.7 (55)
| 
| 19.14 (128)
| Lake Oval
| 22,920
| 31 August 1963
|- style="background:#fff;"
| 
| 7.8 (50)
| 
| 14.13 (97)
| Punt Road Oval
| 17,780
| 31 August 1963
|- style="background:#fff;"
| 
| 6.9 (45)
| 
| 12.14 (86)
| Arden Street Oval
| 12,963
| 31 August 1963
|- style="background:#fff;"
| 
| 4.4 (28)
| 
| 12.12 (84)
| Western Oval
| 27,231
| 31 August 1963
|- style="background:#fff;"
| 
| 13.17 (95)
| 
| 5.4 (34)
| Kardinia Park
| 29,732
| 31 August 1963

Round 18
Going into the final home-and-away round, Hawthorn was the only team with a guaranteed finals berth. It was down to Geelong, Melbourne, St Kilda and Essendon to fight it out for the remaining three play-off positions.

|- style="background:#ccf;"
| Home team
| Home team score
| Away team
| Away team score
| Venue
| Crowd
| Date
|- style="background:#fff;"
| 
| 12.19 (91)
| 
| 8.8 (56)
| MCG
| 24,871
| 7 September 1963
|- style="background:#fff;"
| 
| 8.8 (56)
| 
| 16.13 (109)
| Brunswick Street Oval
| 9,951
| 7 September 1963
|- style="background:#fff;"
| 
| 13.13 (91)
| 
| 8.11 (59)
| Princes Park
| 15,319
| 7 September 1963
|- style="background:#fff;"
| 
| 17.14 (116)
| 
| 4.8 (32)
| Junction Oval
| 22,800
| 7 September 1963
|- style="background:#fff;"
| 
| 6.16 (52)
| 
| 13.12 (90)
| Glenferrie Oval
| 35,000
| 7 September 1963
|- style="background:#fff;"
| 
| 12.11 (83)
| 
| 8.8 (56)
| Windy Hill
| 29,700
| 7 September 1963

Ladder

Consolation Night Series Competition
The night series were held under the floodlights at Lake Oval, South Melbourne, for the teams (5th to 12th on ladder) out of the finals at the end of the season.

Final: Footscray 10.9 (69) defeated Richmond 9.9 (63)

Finals series

Week one

Week two

Week three

Week four

Awards
 The 1963 VFL Premiership team was Geelong.
 The VFL's leading goalkicker was John Peck of Hawthorn who kicked 75 goals (including 6 goals in the final series).
 The winner of the 1963 Brownlow Medal was Bob Skilton of South Melbourne with 20 votes.
 Fitzroy took the "wooden spoon" in 1963.
Geelong 13.12 (90) defeated  7.11 (53) in the Grand Final, held as a curtain-raiser to the seniors Grand Final at the Melbourne Cricket Ground on 5 October.

Notable events
 In Round 5, Collingwood was the first team to score at least 100 points against Melbourne since Footscray in the 1954 Grand Final; Terry Waters kicked 7 goals in Collingwood's 15.10 (100) to 7.10 (52) victory.
 On Saturday 15 June, South Australia beat Victoria 12.8 (80) to 10.13 (73) at the Melbourne Cricket Ground in front of 59,260 spectators. In a brutal return match, in Adelaide, a straighter-kicking Victoria beat South Australia 8.6 (54) to 5.12 (42), a match notorious for a powerful king-hit delivered by Victorian John Peck, who had been included in the team for the return match in order to provide more "grunt" and physical menace, to the jaw of an unsuspecting Brian Sawley. Sawley went some distance in the air before collapsing unconscious in the mud, and had to be carried from the field on a stretcher. Peck was reported, and at the VFL tribunal, Peck testified that the king-hit was in retaliation for Sawley having kicked him in the stomach; Peck was suspended for two weeks.
 Fitzroy's only win during the year was against eventual premiers Geelong, and was achieved without captain-coach Kevin Murray, who was in Adelaide playing for Victoria. Reserves captain Wally Clark took over, and Geelong's weakness in terrible conditions proved their undoing.
 Owing to extremely cold and wet weather, Round 11 was postponed from 13 to 20 July. As of 2022, this is the last time that a complete round of football has been postponed due to weather.

See also
 1963 Miracle Match

References

Bibliography
 
 Rogers, S. & Brown, A., Every Game Ever Played: VFL/AFL Results 1897–1997 (Sixth Edition), Viking Books, (Ringwood), 1998.

External links
 1963 Season - AFL Tables
 Full Points Footy: Peter Argent, "1963 Interstate Match: VFL vs. South Australia: The Day South Australian Football Came of Age"

Australian Football League seasons
VFL season